SSTGFLS J222557+601148 is a planetary nebula in the constellation Cepheus. Located between 2000 and 3000 parsecs distant from Earth, it was originally classified in 2006 as a supernova remnant. Thought to be the first supernova remnant first detected in the infrared wavelengths, the spectrum and properties of the object did not match up well with that of a typical supernova remnant, and it was reclassified as a planetary nebula in 2010. A candidate central star has been identified, with an apparent infrared magnitude of 22.4.

References

Planetary nebulae
Cepheus (constellation)
?